Hendrix Kate Yancey (born August 25, 2011) is an American actress. She is known for her starring role as Jan Broberg in A Friend Of The Family and her earlier roles in Netflix's series Stranger Things and Unbelievable, and Amazon Prime's feature film Charming the Hearts of Men.

Early life 
Yancey was born in Benton, Arkansas, to Timie and Jake Yancey. She has an older brother, Hudson.

Career 
In 2017, at the age of 5, after a workshop at Gray Studios, Yancey acquired Susie Mains of Trilogy Talent as a manager. She then became represented by The Osbrink Agency. Within one month of being represented by Osbrink, Hendrix booked her first series regular role in the American TV series Versus, produced by AwesomenessTV Production. She was in four of the six episodes. A year later, she was brought on board for two short films, Bake Sale and Crystal's Ball.

She was cast in Netflix’s series Unbelievable in 2018 as Daisy, Merritt Wever’s daughter at the age of 9. She was asked to attend the Golden Globe Awards as part of the Unbelievable team. Unbelievable was nominated for four Golden Globes and four Emmy Awards among several other international nominations and remains on Netflix’s most "binge-worthy" shows list.

Shortly after Unbelievable, Hendrix appeared in Amazon’s feature film, Charming the Hearts of Men, alongside Anna Friel, Kelsey Grammer, and Sean Astin.

As of 2022, she appeared as Young Elizabeth in Middle Goblin’s film, Dweller, and can be seen soon as Gwen in George & Tammy, alongside her series parents Michael Shannon and Jessica Chastain. She appeared as number 013 in season 4 of Netflix’s original series, Stranger Things. Yancey is playing a new test subject in the Hawkins Lab and participates in the Nina Project with Dr. Brenner. Stranger Things is Netflix’s most watched show internationally.

Yancey recently completed filming a lead role for Peacock’s limited true crime series, A Friend of the Family. She can be seen playing Jan Broberg, a young girl from Pocatello, Idaho, who was kidnapped multiple times over a period of years by a charismatic, obsessed family "friend". Yancey is starring in the series alongside Mckenna Grace, Anna Paquin, Jake Lacy, Colin Hanks, and Lio Tipton. It was released on October 6, 2022, on Peacock.

Personal life
As of 2022, Yancey splits her time between Hot Springs, Arkansas, and Los Angeles.

Filmography

Film

Television

References 

http://voyagela.com/interview/check-out-hendrix-yanceys-story/

External links

2011 births
Living people
21st-century American actresses
American child actresses
Actresses from Arkansas
People from Benton, Arkansas